George J. "Red" Malackany (May 3, 1913 – December 20, 1983) was an American professional basketball player. He played in college for Duquesne University. Malackany then played in the National Basketball League for the Warren Penns and Pittsburgh Pirates where he averaged 2.8 points per game in his career.

References

1913 births
1983 deaths
People from Rankin, Pennsylvania
American men's basketball players
United States Army personnel of World War II
Basketball players from Pennsylvania
Duquesne Dukes men's basketball players
Guards (basketball)
Pittsburgh Pirates (NBL) players
Warren Penns players